Brissus meridionalis is a species of sea urchins of the family Brissidae. Their armour is covered with spines. Brissus meridionalis was first scientifically described in 1950 by Ole Theodor Jensen Mortensen.

References 

Animals described in 1950
meridionalis
Taxa named by Ole Theodor Jensen Mortensen